Willem Hoornstra  (born 19 February 1948, Zwolle) is a Dutch politician.

See also
List of Dutch politicians

References

1948 births
Living people
Christian Democratic Appeal politicians
Mayors in Gelderland
Mayors in Friesland
People from Zwolle